is a 2009 Japanese film. It was based on a manga of the same name by Kotomi Aoki, and it was released on 24 October 2009 in Japanese cinemas. The story revolves around Takuma Kakinouchi, a boy who is told he will die before he is 20, and Mayu Taneda, a girl who is in love with him.

The film is directed by director Takehiko Shinjo, and stars newcomer actor Masaki Okada and actress Mao Inoue, who played the role of Makino Tsukushi in the television drama and film adaptation of Hana Yori Dango. The film's theme song was sung by Japanese singer Ken Hirai.

Plot

The film begins when Mayu and Takuma were children. They were friends since they were 8 years old. Takuma has a heart disease and he is treated by a cardiologist who happens to be Mayu's father. One day, Takuma and Mayu overhear that Takuma will not live past the age of 20 due to his condition. However, their friendship grows and Takuma becomes Mayu's first love. When they are out playing in the fields, Takuma promises to marry Mayu when they turn 20.

Time passes, and Mayu and Takuma have grown up and are attending junior high school, but their love for each other remains unchanged. However, Takuma, who knows his days are numbered, wanted to push away his feelings for Mayu and distance himself from Mayu, because he cannot stand to see her cry or hurt her more than he already has. He promised to himself that after his last day in junior high, he will leave Mayu. He decided to attend an elite high school, which Takuma thinks that Mayu cannot go into.

To Takuma's surprise, Mayu managed to go into that school and had actually done well enough in the school's entrance examination that she became the 1st year student body representative. She scolded Takuma in front of everyone in the school hall, when she should be making her welcome speech. She told Takuma that even if he wanted to abandon her, it will not happen in a 100,000 years. Therefore, they became known to the school as lovers.

Mayu then meets Kou, who likes her and asked her to be his girlfriend. However, Mayu refuses. On the other hand, Takuma meets Teru, another patient with the same heart condition as his whom he had met in the past, and Mayu gets jealous when he spent a lot of time visiting her. Kou asked Takuma to give Mayu to him, as Takuma should spare Mayu from the pain when Takuma dies. Mayu and Takuma broke up briefly because Takuma granted Teru her wish of experiencing a kiss before she died. When Takuma visited Teru the next day, he found out that she had died.

Takuma then issued Kou a challenge- they would run a 100-meter race, with the loser backing off from Mayu. Kou accepted the challenge but Takuma wins, and went to find Mayu for a date. That day, Kou went out of the school at the same time as Mayu and Takuma, and was knocked down by an oncoming train. Then, Takuma was informed that he had a suitable heart donor. Later, Mayu found out that the donor was the now brain-dead Kou, and tried to hide the fact from Takuma. However, Takuma eventually found out and refused the donation. At the same time, Kou's family saw that Kou had shed tears, and decided that there might be a miracle, and refused the donation as well. Mayu begged them many times, but they still refused to budge, although Kou had registered as a heart donor.

Later, Takuma suffered a heart attack. He was rushed to hospital, and the doctor did not give him much chance of living. In his sleep, Takuma prayed that he could have just a short time more to live, and he got a miraculous recovery, and surprised Mayu. He brought Mayu on their "honeymoon", visiting many places. Finally, at the field where they first kissed, Takuma told Mayu that he was very lucky and was happy with his life, handing over his lucky-charm 'will' to her that he had written when he was eight years old..

Upon their arrival back to the hospital, Takuma suffered another heart attack and despite the best efforts of the doctor, he passed away. Mayu went to the roof and opened his letter, which told everyone to be happy when he was gone. The film ends with Mayu borrowing the urn containing Takuma's ashes, and went to a church to have a "wedding", thus fulfilling their promise when they were young.

The ending scene is a flashback of the first time the 2 met at the hospital when they were 8 years old.

Cast
 Mao Inoue played Mayu Taneda, the daughter of Takuma's doctor, Dr. Takahito Taneda
 Masaki Okada as Takuma Kakunouchi, who is suffering from heart disease
 Tetta Sugimoto as Minoru Kakinouchi, Takuma's father
 Yoko Moriguchi as Ryoko Kakinouchi, Takuma's mother
 Natsuki Harada as Teru Uehara, a fellow patient with the same disease as Takuma; she became friends with the 2 kids during one of Takuma's  stays in the hospital
 Yoshihiko Hosoda as Kou Suzuya
 Keiko Horiuchi as Yoshimi Suzuya, Kou's mother
 Yuki Terada as Yoko Tamura, Sae's roommate and friend in high school
 Masataka Kubota as Ritsu Sugiyama, Takama's roommate in high school
 Gaku Yamamoto as Ryujo Suzuya, Kou's grandfather
 Toru Nakamura as Dr. Takahito Taneda, Mayu's father and Takuma's doctor
 Sea Kumada as the young Mayu Taneda
 Kaito Kobayashi as the young Takuma Kakunouchi.

Production

Development
The live-action film adaptation of the manga was first announced on 1 December 2008. The film was directed by the director Shinjo Takehiko, the director of Tada, Kimi o Aishiteru.

Pre-production
Mao Inoue, who previously played the lead Makino Tsukushi in Hana Yori Dango, was chosen to play Mayu in this film, starring alongside actor Okada Masaki.

Filming
The filming of the film started in March 2009, once lead actress Mao Inoue had graduated from Meiji University.

Post-production
The film's 90 second trailer was first posted on the film's official website on 1 September 2009.

Theme song
It was sung by Japanese pop singer Ken Hirai, and was produced by DefStar Records.

Release

Cinema
I Give My First Love to You was first released in Japan on 24 October 2009.

Home video
The home video for I Give My First Love to You was released on 21 April 2010 in Blu-ray and DVD Region 2 formats.

Reception

Critical reception
Pick 'n' Mix Flix describes the film as "a good old-fashioned tear-jerker that may appeal more to twenty-somethings but still was powerful enough to bring some moisture to my old eyes." and gave it a rating of 7 out of 10.

Box office
In Japan, this film debuted on 302 screens and earned $3.07 million, making it the highest grossing film in Japan and 20th highest internationally that week. According to the Motion Picture Producers Association of Japan, I Give My First Love to You was the 17th highest grossing Japanese film of 2009 with a total gross of 2.15 billion yen.

Accolades
Masaki Okada won the award of the Newcomer of the Year at the 2010 Japanese Academy Awards for his role in I Give My First Love to You, Honokaa Boy, and A Pierrot. He was also the "Best Newcomer" at the 22nd Nikkan Sports Film Awards.

See also
 List of 2009 box office number-one films in Japan

References

External links
 Official Toho site 
 Kinejun Cinema 
 
 Singapore Movie Release Official Page 

2009 films
Live-action films based on manga
Nippon TV films
Toho films
Films directed by Takehiko Shinjō